Félix Garand-Gauthier (born November 2, 1995) is a professional Canadian football fullback for the Hamilton Tiger-Cats of the Canadian Football League (CFL).

University career
Following high school, Garand-Gauthier played as a quarterback for the Lionel-Groulx Nordiques in CEGEP. He then played U Sports football for the Laval Rouge et Or from 2018 to 2019. In 2018, he won a Vanier Cup championship when the Rouge et Or defeated the Western Mustangs in the 54th Vanier Cup game. Over the course of his university career, Garand-Gauthier played in 14 games and recorded 12 receptions for 152 yards and three touchdowns and had 11 carries for 23 rushing yards and three touchdowns. He was named a U Sports Second Team All-Canadian in 2019. He did not play in 2020 due to the cancellation of the 2020 U Sports football season and was draft-eligible for the Canadian Football League in 2021.

Professional career
Garand-Gauthier was drafted in the fifth round, 37th overall, by the Hamilton Tiger-Cats in the 2021 CFL Draft and signed with the team on May 21, 2021. He made the team's active roster following training camp in 2021 and played in his first career professional game on August 5, 2021, against the Winnipeg Blue Bombers. He played as a backup fullback where he had his first career rushing attempt on October 10, 2021, against the Toronto Argonauts, that went for one yard on a failed third down conversion. He played in 11 regular season games in 2021 where he had eight special teams tackles. He also played in all three post-season games, including his first Grey Cup game against the Winnipeg Blue Bombers. He recorded one special teams tackle and one fumble recovery in the 108th Grey Cup game, but the Tiger-Cats lost in overtime to the Blue Bombers.

References

External links
 Hamilton Tiger-Cats bio

1995 births
Living people
Canadian football fullbacks
Hamilton Tiger-Cats players
Players of Canadian football from Quebec
People from Mirabel, Quebec
Laval Rouge et Or football players